Michael Anthony Tavera is an American composer best known for his animation scores. He has also worked on countless television series, live-action films, and direct-to-video sequels.

Biography
Tavera grew up in Los Angeles. He is most notable for composing music for shows such as ¡Mucha Lucha!, Star Wars Resistance, and Guardians of the Galaxy.

Filmography

Film

Television

Video games

Games

References

External links

American film score composers
American male film score composers
American people of Dominican Republic descent
American television composers
Animated film score composers
Living people
Male television composers
Video game composers
Year of birth missing (living people)